Harlan Wetz (September 15, 1925 – November 14, 1983) was an American football tackle. He played for the Brooklyn Dodgers in 1947.

References

1925 births
1983 deaths
American football tackles
Texas Longhorns football players
Brooklyn Dodgers (AAFC) players
Sportspeople from New Braunfels, Texas